Jonathan Wells may refer to:

Jonathan Wells (intelligent design advocate) (born 1942), American author and intelligent design advocate
Jonathan Wells (American football) (born 1979), American football running back
Jonathan Wells (cricketer) (born 1988), Australian cricketer
Jonathan Hale Wells, entrepreneur, co-founder and Head of Programming of RES Media Group

See also 
John Wells (disambiguation)
Wells (name)
Welles (name)